Trujillo or Truxillo may refer to:

Places

Colombia 
Trujillo, Valle del Cauca, a municipality in the department of Valle del Cauca
Trujillo Province (Gran Colombia), part of the historic republic from 1819 to 1831

Dominican Republic 
Ciudad Trujillo, the former name of the city of Santo Domingo

Honduras 
Trujillo, Honduras, a municipality in the department of Colón

Mexico
Trujillo, Mexico, a city

Peru 
Trujillo, Peru, a city in the province of Trujillo
Trujillo metropolitan area (Peru), a metropolitan area of Trujillo city
Historic Centre of Trujillo
Trujillo District, a district in the province of Trujillo
Trujillo Province, Peru, a province in the region of La Libertad

Puerto Rico 
 Trujillo Alto, Puerto Rico, a municipality
 Trujillo Alto barrio-pueblo, a downtown and municipality seat
 Trujillo Bajo, Carolina, Puerto Rico, a barrio

Spain 
Trujillo, Cáceres, a municipality in the autonomous community of Extremadura
Robledillo de Trujillo

United States 
Trujillo, Colorado, a place in Archuleta County, Colorado
Trujillo, Texas, an unincorporated community in Oldham County, Texas
Truxillo, Virginia, an unincorporated community in Amelia County, Virginia

Venezuela 
Trujillo (state), one of the 23 states which make up the country
Trujillo, Trujillo, a municipality in the state of Trujillo
Trujillo Province (Venezuela), in existence from 1831 to 1864
Trujillo Canton, a canton in former Trujillo Province

Other uses
 Trujillo (surname)
 Rafael Trujillo, dictator of the Dominican Republic from 1930 to 1961
 CF Trujillo, a Spanish football team based in Trujillo, Cáceres
 Sport Coopsol Trujillo, a football club based in the city of Trujillo, Peru
 Trujillo (beer), Peruvian brand
 Trujillo Airport (IATA: TJI), serving Trujillo, Colón, Honduras
 Trujillo International Airport, serving Trujillo, Peru
 Trujillo River, a river in Mexico
 SS Trujillo, the last lake tanker to operate in Lake Maracaibo, retired in 1954

See also
 Diocese of Trujillo (disambiguation), multiple dioceses